The Régiment de La Couronne (Regiment of the Crown) was an infantry regiment of the Kingdom of France, created in 1643.

Lineage

 1643 : creation of the Régiment de La Reine-Mère (Regiment of the Queen Mother)
 1666 : renamed Régiment de Genlis
 1666 : renamed Régiment d’Artois
 1673 : named  Régiment de La Couronne (Regiment of the Crown)
 January 1, 1791 : renamed the 45th Line Infantry Regiment
 December 3, 1794 : the 1st Battalion was incorporated into the 89th Battle Demi-Brigade when that demi-brigade formed. 
 1795 : the 2nd Battalion was incorporated into the 86th Battle Demi-Brigade when it formed.

Equipment

Regimental Colors

During the Siege of Maastricht (1673), the Régiment d’Artois was renamed La Couronne (The Crown) as a reward for valor, and awarded new regimental arms, a white cross on an azure background with the motto Dedit hanc Mastrika coronam "Maastricht [lui] a valu cette couronne" (Maastricht won this crown).

9 regimental colors out of which one "white", Colonel and eight for ordinance, "all blue with the French Crown in gold in the middle of each white cross".

Uniform

History

Colonels and mestres de camp 
 June 25, 1643: François-Marie de l’Hôpital, Duke of Vitry, Colonel
 June 7, 1757: N. Bruslard, Marquis de Genlis
 June 1673: N. Bruslard, Marquis de Gelis-Bethancourt
 September 1675: N. Bruslard, Marquis de Genlis
 March 12, 1677: Hardouin Bruslard, Chevalier de Genlis
 March 30, 1693: N. de Prunier, Marquis de Saint-André
 July 26, 1698: Louis, Marquis de Polastron
 May 11, 1707: René-François de Froulay, Chevalier de Tessé
 February 17, 1712: Jean François Gabriel, Count of Polastron
 March 10, 1734: Armand Louis de Béthune, Marquis de Charost, killed in 1735 near Trèves
 November 11, 1735: Louis-Ferdinand-Joseph de Croi, Duke of Havré, Colonel-lieutenant
 Mars 14 1758: Marie-Alexandre-Léonor-Louis-César de Saint-Mauris, Count of Montbarrey
 November 30, 1761: Pierre-Constantin Le Vicomte, Count of Blangy
 June 22, 1767: Claude-Antoine de Béziade, Marquis d’Avaray
 November 11, 1782: Marie-Gabriel-Florent-Auguste, Count of Choiseul-Gouffier
 January 1, 1784: Augustin-Louis-Charles, Marquis de Lameth
 October 21, 1791: Joseph-Marie-Anne de Moyria
 March 8, 1793: François Goulu

Campaign and battles 
Régiment de La Couronne
 The Regiment de la Couronne was garrisoned in Bonn during the Siege of Bonn (1703). On October 13, 1703, the marquis Yves d'Alègre, governor of the city, sent the regiment in a counter-attack. Colonel de Polastron was wounded in action during this operation.

45th Line Infantry Regiment
The 45th Line Infantry Regiment participated in the 1792-1793 campaign with the Army of the North (France), and in 1794 with the Army of Sambre and Meuse .

See also
Troupes de la marine

References

Sources and bibliographies 
 Jean Churchill de Marlborough, Histoire de Jean Churchill, duc de Marlborough, vol. 1, Jean Imprimerie Impériale (Paris), 1808, 409 p. (lire en ligne [archive]).
Oscar, vicomte de Poli, Le Régiment de La Couronne : (1643-1791), Paris, Conseil héraldique de France, 1891, 370 p.

Military units and formations established in 1643
Military units and formations disestablished in 1795
Line infantry regiments of the Ancien Régime